Stuart Town railway station is a heritage-listed railway station located on the Main Western line in Stuart Town in the Dubbo Regional Council local government area of New South Wales, Australia. The station serves the town of Stuart Town and opened on 1 June 1880 when the line was extended from Orange to Wellington. It became an unstaffed station on 10 April 1976. The station is also known as Stuart Town Railway Station group. The station was added to the New South Wales State Heritage Register on 2 April 1999.

Services
Stuart Town is served by NSW TrainLink's daily Central West XPT service operating between Sydney and Dubbo.

Description 

The station building is a type 4, brick third class building that was completed in 1880. A station master's residence is located adjacent to the station gatehouse, and is a type 5, brick building with a pyramid roof and central chimney, also completed in 1880. An out shed and lamp room/WC complete the complex.

The platform face is made of brick with a dock platform. A timber picket fence separates the platform from the adjacent car park.

Heritage listing 
Stuart Town is one of the best third class country stations on the NSW railway system. The station building is of high quality with good detail and the retention of a very interesting entrance porch and the setting retains ancillary buildings, signs and platform with a good example of a typical early gatehouse that were seen throughout NSW. With Wellington, this station is an important reminder of the early line through the area which showed confidence and pride in railway construction by the substantial quality of the buildings not seen on the later lines that developed.

Stuart Town railway station was listed on the New South Wales State Heritage Register on 2 April 1999 having satisfied the following criteria:

The place possesses uncommon, rare or endangered aspects of the cultural or natural history of New South Wales.

This item is assessed as historically rare. This item is assessed as archaeologically rare. This item is assessed as socially rare.

See also 

Railway stations in New South Wales

References

Attribution

External links

Stuart Town station details Transport for New South Wales

New South Wales State Heritage Register
Dubbo Regional Council
Articles incorporating text from the New South Wales State Heritage Register
Easy Access railway stations in New South Wales
Railway stations in Australia opened in 1880
Regional railway stations in New South Wales
Main Western railway line, New South Wales